Acrochordonichthys strigosus is a species of catfish of the family Akysidae. It is a freshwater fish only known from the Kapuas River drainage in Kalimantan, in the Indonesian part of Borneo. It grows to  standard length. A detailed discussion of this species's relationship with the other members of its genus can be found on Acrochordonichthys.

References

Akysidae
Freshwater fish of Borneo
Endemic fauna of Borneo
Fish described in 2001